Parsons State Hospital & Training Center, a major facility occupying 43 buildings, is also known by its shorter name, Parsons State Hospital It is a teaching hospital located in Parsons, Kansas, and is one of four Kansas state 
hospitals.

Overview
The Kansas Department for Aging and Disability Services (KDADS) has advisory and regulatory oversight of services provided by the hospital to those with intellectual and developmental disabilities. It is one of the state's two locations with these services in a residential setting.

History
Parsons "opened in 1903 as a State Hospital for Epileptics." It was given its current names in 1957. Parsons "is one of two facilities in the state that serve Kansans with intellectual disabilities.

Included in its 163 acres is a cemetery.

A collection of Governor Arthur Capper's correspondences includes two letters of complaint from inmates at Parsons State Hospital.

Controversy
Terms such as de-institutionalize, phased reduction, consolidation and closure regarding "Kansans whose disabilities are at such an extreme level that they need" special care were part of discussions in 1998 and 2010. Economic factors such as more than 1,000 jobs on the one hand, and millions of dollars on the other, were involved. The Associated Press described this as a national trend and cited a study which disclosed that "eight states no longer run such institutions for the mentally disabled."

The governor also mentioned "more restricted admission standards." The legislature disagreed.

See also
 Booth Memorial Hospital

References

External links
 Parsons State Hospital and Training Center website

Teaching hospitals in Kansas
Psychiatric hospitals in Kansas